Lady Astor commonly refers to Nancy Astor, Viscountess Astor (1879–1964).

Lady Astor may also refer to:

Viscountess Astor
Sarah Baring (1920–2013), 1st wife of the 3rd Viscount Astor
Phillipa Victoria Hunloke, 2nd wife of William Astor, 3rd Viscount Astor
Bronwen Astor (1930–2017), 3rd wife of the 3rd Viscount
Annabel Astor, Viscountess Astor (born 1948), wife of William Astor, 4th Viscount Astor

Baroness Astor of Hever
Violet Astor (1889–1965), wife of the John Jacob Astor, 1st Baron Astor of Hever
Irene Astor, Baroness Astor of Hever (1919–2001), wife of the Gavin Astor, 2nd Baron Astor of Hever
Fiona Diana Lennox-Harvey, 1st wife of the John Astor, 3rd Baron Astor of Hever
Liz Astor, Baroness Astor of Hever (born 1950), 2nd wife of the 3rd Baron

See also
Lord Astor (disambiguation)